The Bosworth fracture is a rare fracture of the distal fibula with an associated fixed posterior dislocation of the proximal fibular fragment which becomes trapped behind the posterior tibial tubercle. The injury is caused by severe external rotation of the ankle. The ankle remains externally rotated after the injury, making interpretation of X-rays difficult which can lead to misdiagnosis and incorrect treatment. The injury is most commonly treated by open reduction internal fixation as closed reduction is made difficult by the entrapment of the fibula behind the tibia.

The entrapment of an intact fibula behind the tibia was described by Ashhurst and Bromer in 1922, who attributed the description of the mechanism of injury to Huguier's 1848 publication. The injury involving fibular fracture with posterior dislocation was described by David M. Bosworth in 1947.

References

External links 

Bone fractures